Jan Hajer (The Hague, 31 March 1942 - Breda, 27 August 2002) was a Dutch tennis player. He was the national champion in 1963. He represented the Netherlands in the Davis-Cup between 1964 and 1968.

Biography 
Hajer was a contemporary of Tom Okker who overshadowed Hajer's career. The two were teammates in the Haarlem Lawn Tennis Club.

Hajer won the 1963 national championships, succeeding Willem Maris who was Dutch national champion in 1962. In 1964 Jan Hajer lost the final against Tom Okker. Later Hajer and Okker represented the Netherlands in the Davis Cup team. Hajer played 18 singles matches in seven Davis Cup ties, scoring 5 victories and 13 losses. His most famous win was over Cliff Drysdale in the 1967 Davis Cup.

Hajer participated in Wimbledon three times. In 1967 he reached the second round which he lost in five sets to Jaidip Mukerjea. Hajer and Okker competed in doubles events in South Africa, Philippines and Australia.

References

External links
 
 

1942 births
Dutch male tennis players
Sportspeople from The Hague
2002 deaths